1991 in sports describes the year's events in world sport.

Alpine skiing
 Alpine Skiing World Cup
 Men's overall season champion: Marc Girardelli, Luxembourg
 Women's overall season champion: Petra Kronberger, Austria

American football
 Super Bowl XXV – the New York Giants (NFC) won 20–19 over the Buffalo Bills (AFC)
Location: Tampa Stadium
Attendance: 73,813
MVP: Ottis Anderson, RB (New York)
 Thurman Thomas of the Buffalo Bills is named the NFL MVP
 Orange Bowl (1990 season):
 The Colorado Buffaloes won 10–9 over the Notre Dame Fighting Irish to win the AP Poll national championships
 Desmond Howard, University of Michigan wide receiver seals the Heisman Trophy with a 93-yard punt return in Michigan's 31–3 hammering of Ohio State.
 World Bowl '91: London Monarchs won 21–0 over the Barcelona Dragons in the inaugural World Bowl.
 Quarterback Stan Gelbaugh of the London Monarchs is named the World League of American Football's inaugural seasons Most Valuable Player

Artistic gymnastics
 World Artistic Gymnastics Championships –
Men's all-around champion: Grigory Misutin, USSR
Women's all-around champion: Kim Zmeskal, United States
Men's team competition champion: USSR
Women's team competition champion: USSR

Association football
 European Cup – Red Star Belgrade beat Olympique de Marseille 5–3 on penalties (0–0 aet)
 FIFA Women's World Cup – United States won 2–1 over Norway

Athletics
 1991 World Championships in Athletics held in Tokyo
 30 August – Track & Field World Championship Mike Powell breaking Bob Beamon's 23-year-old Long Jump world record with a mark of 29' 4 1/2"

Australian rules football
 Australian Football League
 The Adelaide Crows join the league
 25 April –  and  kick between them 32.18 (210) in the first half. It is the record aggregate score for a half of VFL/AFL football.
 2 June –  kick their first goal with 33 second to go against , the closest a team has come to finishing goalless since  kicked 0.8 (8) in 1961 against St. Kilda.
 8 September – Hawthorn beat West Coast 18.16 (124) to 15.11 (101) in the first final outside Melbourne.
 1991 AFL Grand Final (28 September) – Hawthorn wins the 95th AFL premiership beating West Coast 20.19 (139) to 13.8 (86) in the only Grand Final at VFL Park.
 Brownlow Medal awarded to Jim Stynes (Melbourne)

Baseball
 Dave Righetti breaks Sparky Lyle's major league record for left-handers of 238 career saves.
 1 May – Nolan Ryan pitchers his seventh career no hitter with a 3–0 victory over the Toronto Blue Jays
 28 July – Dennis Martínez of the Montreal Expos pitches the 13th perfect game in major league history, beating the Los Angeles Dodgers 2–0.
 World Series – The Minnesota Twins win 4 games to 3 over the Atlanta Braves. The series MVP is Jack Morris of Minnesota.
 Cal Ripken Jr. of the Baltimore Orioles is named AL MVP
 Terry Pendleton of the Atlanta Braves is named NL MVP
 Roger Clemens of the Boston Red Sox is named AL Cy Young award winner. It is his third of six in his career
 Tom Glavine of the Atlanta Braves is named NL Cy Young award winner 
 Chuck Knoblauch of the Minnesota Twins is named AL Rookie of the Year
 Jeff Bagwell of the Houston Astros is named NL Rookie of the Year

Basketball
 NCAA Men's Basketball Championship – Duke wins 72–65 over Kansas
 Larry Johnson of UNLV is named Naismith College Player of the Year
9 February – Dee Brown win the Gatorade Slam Dunk Contest
10 February – NBA All-Star Game is held in Charlotte, North Carolina
 12 June – NBA Finals: Chicago Bulls win 4 games to 1 over the Los Angeles Lakers to earn the franchise's first championship, starting a run of six titles in eight seasons.
 Michael Jordan is named the NBA MVP, his second of 5 awards.
 7 November – Lakers' superstar Magic Johnson announces he tested positive for the virus that causes AIDS, thus ending his career in the NBA.
 National Basketball League (Australia) Finals: Perth Wildcats defeated the Eastside Melbourne Spectres 2–1 in the best-of-three final series.
 17 December – The Cleveland Cavaliers beat the Miami Heat 148 to 80, the largest margin of victory in any NBA game.

Boxing
 3 March – Mike Tyson defeats Donovan Ruddock in a seventh-round TKO
 19 April – Evander Holyfield defeats George Foreman to retain WBC, WBA & IBF Heavyweight titles
 7 to 12 May – 29th European Amateur Boxing Championships held in Gothenburg, Sweden
 3 June – Thomas Hearns defeats Virgil Hill with a unanimous decision to win WBA Light Heavyweight title
 1 June at Palm Springs, California – Terry Norris knocked out Donald Curry in the 8th Round to win the WBC Super Welterweight Championship.
 28 June Mike Tyson defeats Donovan Ruddock in a rematch with a 12-round unanimous decision
 2 to 18 August – Pan American Games held in Havana, Cuba.
 5 October – James Toney defeats Michael Nunn with a TKO to win IBF Middleweight title
 James Toney is named Ring Magazine fighter of the year

Canadian football
 Grey Cup – Toronto Argonauts win 36–21 over the Calgary Stampeders
 B.C. Lions Quarterback Doug Flutie is named CFL Most Outstanding Player
 Vanier Cup – Wilfrid Laurier Golden Hawks win 25–18 over the Mount Allison Mounties

Cricket
 South Africa readmitted to the International Cricket Council following the abolition of apartheid, and play their first international game since 1970.

Cycling
 Giro d'Italia won by Franco Chioccioli of Italy
 Tour de France – Miguel Indurain of Spain
 UCI Road World Championships – Men's road race – Gianni Bugno of Italy

Dogsled racing
 Iditarod Trail Sled Dog Race Champion –
 Rick Swenson won with lead dog: Goose

Field hockey
 Men's Champions Trophy: Germany
 Women's Champions Trophy: Australia

Figure skating
 World Figure Skating Championships –
 Men's champion: Kurt Browning, Canada
 Ladies' champion: Kristi Yamaguchi, United States
 Pair skating champions: Natalia Mishkutenok & Artur Dmitriev, Soviet Union
 Ice dancing champions: Isabelle Duchesnay & Paul Duchesnay, France

Golf
Men's professional
 Master – Ian Woosnam
 U.S. Open – Payne Stewart
 British Open – Ian Baker-Finch
 PGA Championship – John Daly
 PGA Tour money leader – Corey Pavin – $979,430
 Senior PGA Tour money leader – Mike Hill – $1,065,657
 Ryder Cup – United States team won 14½ – 13½ over the Europe in team golf.
Men's amateur
 British Amateur – Gary Wolstenholme
 U.S. Amateur – Mitch Voges
 European Amateur – Jim Payne
 Tiger Woods, at age 15, won his first USGA title, the U.S. Junior Amateur.
Women's professional
 Nabisco Dinah Shore – Amy Alcott
 LPGA Championship – Meg Mallon
 U.S. Women's Open – Meg Mallon
 Classique du Maurier – Nancy Scranton
 LPGA Tour money leader – Pat Bradley – $763,118

Harness racing
 North America Cup – Precious Bunny
 United States Pacing Triple Crown races –
 Cane Pace – Silky Stallone
 Little Brown Jug – Precious Bunny
 Messenger Stakes – Die Laughing
 United States Trotting Triple Crown races –
 Hambletonian – Giant Victory
 Yonkers Trot – Crown's Invitation
 Kentucky Futurity – Whiteland Janice
 Australian Inter Dominion Harness Racing Championship –
 Pacers: Mark Ranover
 Trotters: Fraggle Rock

Horse racing
Steeplechases
 Cheltenham Gold Cup – Garrison Savannah
 Grand National – Seagram
Flat races
 Australia – Melbourne Cup won by Let's Elope
 Canadian Triple Crown Races:
 Queen's Plate – Dance Smartly
 Prince of Wales Stakes – Dance Smartly
 Breeders' Stakes – Dance Smartly
 Dance Smartly becomes the country's third consecutive Triple Crown winner.
 France – Prix de l'Arc de Triomphe won by Suave Dancer
 Ireland – Irish Derby Stakes won by Generous
 Japan – Japan Cup won by Golden Pheasant
 English Triple Crown Races:
 2,000 Guineas Stakes – Mystiko
 The Derby – Generous
 St. Leger Stakes – Toulon
 United States Triple Crown Races:
 Kentucky Derby – Strike the Gold
 Preakness Stakes – Hansel
 Belmont Stakes – Hansel
 Breeders' Cup World Thoroughbred Championships:
 Breeders' Cup Classic – Black Tie Affair
 Breeders' Cup Distaff – Dance Smartly
 Breeders' Cup Juvenile – Arazi
 Breeders' Cup Juvenile Fillies – Pleasant Stage
 Breeders' Cup Mile – Opening Verse
 Breeders' Cup Sprint – Sheikh Albadou
 Breeders' Cup Turf – Miss Alleged

Ice hockey
 Art Ross Trophy as the NHL's leading scorer during the regular season: Wayne Gretzky, Los Angeles Kings
 Hart Memorial Trophy for the NHL's Most Valuable Player: Brett Hull, St. Louis Blues
 Stanley Cup
 Pittsburgh Penguins win 4 games to 2 over the Minnesota North Stars
 Conn Smythe Trophy – Mario Lemieux, Pittsburgh Penguins
 World Hockey Championship
 Men's champion: Sweden defeated Canada
 Junior Men's champion: Canada defeated the USSR
 Sheffield Steelers formed
 San Jose Sharks formed
 Northern Michigan University wins the NCAA Division I title in hockey, 8–7 in the third overtime against Boston University.

Lacrosse
 The Detroit Turbos defeat the Baltimore Thunder to win the Major Indoor Lacrosse League championship

Motorsport

Radiosport
 The Friendship Radiosport Games held in Portland, Oregon, United States was the first international Amateur Radio Direction Finding competition held in the Americas.
 Third European High Speed Telegraphy Championship held in Neerpelt, Belgium.

Rugby League
 Penrith Panthers defeat two-time defending premiers Canberra Raiders in the New South Wales Rugby League Grand Final at the Sydney Football Stadium. It is Penrith's first premiership since their admission in 1967.
 Wigan retained their title in the English Rugby League competition, with Oldham, Sheffield Eagles and Rochdale Hornets being relegated. To date this is Rochdale's last appearance in the top flight.

Rugby Union
 97th Five Nations Championship series is won by England who complete the Grand Slam
 Australia wins the 1991 Rugby World Cup

Snooker
 World Snooker Championship – John Parrott beats Jimmy White 18–11
 World rankings – Stephen Hendry remains world number one for 1991/92

Swimming
 The sixth FINA World Championships, held in Perth, Australia (3 January – 13)
 Eleventh Pan American Games held in Havana, Cuba (12–18 August)
 20th European LC Championships, held in Athens, Greece (18–25 August)
 Fourth Pan Pacific Championships, held in Edmonton, Alberta, Canada (22–25 August)
 First European Sprint Championships, held in Gelsenkirchen, Germany (6–8 December)
 13 December – Steve Crocker sets the first official world record in the men's 50m freestyle (short course) in Sheffield, United Kingdom, clocking 25.64.

Taekwondo
 World Championships held in Athens, Greece

Tennis
 20 June – death of Michael Westphal (26), German player
 Grand Slam in tennis men's results:
 Australian Open – Boris Becker
 French Open – Jim Courier
 Wimbledon championships – Michael Stich
 U.S. Open – Stefan Edberg
 Grand Slam in tennis women's results:
 Australian Open – Monica Seles
 French Open – Monica Seles
 Wimbledon championships – Steffi Graf
 U.S. Open – Monica Seles
 Davis Cup – France won 3–1 over the United States in world tennis.

Triathlon
 ITU World Championships held in Gold Coast, Queensland
 ITU World Cup (eleven races) started in the United States Virgin Islands and ended in Mexico
 ETU European Championships held in Geneva, Switzerland

Volleyball
Men's competition
 FIVB World League: Italy
 Asia Volleyball Championship: Japan
 Men's European Volleyball Championship: USSR
 Pan American Games: Cuba
Women's competition
 Asia Volleyball Championship: China
 Women's European Volleyball Championship: USSR
 Pan American Games: Cuba

Water polo
 FINA Men's World Water Polo Championship: USA
 FINA Women's World Water Polo Championship: Netherlands

Multi-sport events
 Eleventh Pan American Games held in Havana, Cuba
 Fifth All-Africa Games held in Cairo, Egypt
 Eleventh Mediterranean Games held in Athens, Greece
 Sixteenth Summer Universiade held in Sheffield, United Kingdom
 Fifteenth Winter Universiade held in Sapporo, Japan
 Sixteenth Southeast Asian Games held in Manila, Philippines

Awards
 Associated Press Male Athlete of the Year – Michael Jordan, NBA basketball
 Associated Press Female Athlete of the Year – Monica Seles, Tennis
 Sports Illustrated Sportsman of the Year – Michael Jordan
 James E. Sullivan Award – Olympic Long Jumper Mike Powell

References

 
Sports by year